

Medalists

Medal table

References

2003 in sailing
2003 Games of the Small States of Europe
Sailing at the Games of the Small States of Europe
Sailing competitions in Malta